USS Polaris (AF-11) was a Type C2 "Liberty fleet" standard freighter and an  acquired from the United States Maritime Commission by the US Navy for World War II and the Korean War.  She was launched in 1939 at Sun Shipbuilding & Drydock Co., Chester, Pennsylvania.

Service history

World War II and postwar

Polaris made five round trips from the U.S. East Coast to Reykjavík, Iceland from June 1942 to February 1943. She then made five voyages from the U.S. East Coast to Port of Spain, Trinidad, and San Juan, Puerto Rico, March to July 1943. From October 1943 to February 1944 she made four more voyages to the Caribbean, touching at Port of Spain, Trinidad; Guantanamo Bay, Cuba; Hamilton, Bermuda; the Virgin Islands; and San Juan, Puerto Rico.

From March through September 1944 Polaris made three round-trip voyages in convoy from the east coast to Oran, Algeria, and other Mediterranean ports. In October she made another voyage to the Caribbean.

Polaris then sailed to Enewetak, Saipan, Tinian, and Apra before returning to Seattle, Washington on 9 January 1945.

She was underway on 16 January to Pearl Harbor, Eniwetok, and Ulithi. She returned to Los Angeles, California on 31 March and was underway again 13 April on a replenishment cruise to the Carolines and the Ryukyus, firing on Tokashiki Island in the Ryukyus on 9 July, and returning to San Francisco on 30 August.

After serving in Japanese waters and on the China coast, Polaris was decommissioned on 18 January 1946. She was struck from the Naval Vessel Register 7 February 1946 and transferred to the Maritime Commission on 30 June 1946.

Korean War and fate

Polaris served in the Korean War with Service Squadron 1 and made six journeys to Korean waters between 29 January 1951 and 23 July 1954. Aldebaran-class provisions store ship set a record for her class in number of tons of provisions transferred per hour while on underway replenishment, delivering 116.10 tons per hour to the aircraft carrier  on 29 April 1955.

She was struck from the Naval Vessel Register 10 October 1957, and transferred to the Maritime Administration. Into 1970 she was in the National Defense Reserve Fleet berthed in Suisun Bay, California.

References and notes

 

Type C2 ships
1939 ships
Aldebaran-class stores ships
Ships built by the Sun Shipbuilding & Drydock Company
World War II auxiliary ships of the United States
Korean War auxiliary ships of the United States